The Danish Orienteering Federation ( DOF)    is the national Orienteering Association in Denmark. It is recognized as the  orienteering association for Denmark by the International Orienteering Federation, of which it is a member.

History
The Danish Orienteering Federation was founded in 1941. It was among the ten founding members of the International Orienteering Federation in 1961, and Denmark participated in the first European Orienteering Championships in 1962. Denmark hosted the world championships in 1974, and again in 2006.
The Danish male team won gold medals in the relay at the 1997 World Orienteering Championships. Among Danish individual world champions in foot orienteering are Mona Nørgaard and Søren Bobach.

See also 
 Danish orienteers

References

External links
Official website of the Dansk Orienterings-Forbund (DOF)

International Orienteering Federation members
Orienteering